Matthias Schmid (born 18 November 1997) is a German professional golfer. He won the European Amateur in both 2019 and 2020 and was the leading amateur at the 2021 Open Championship.

Amateur career
Schmid competed for the Louisville Cardinals from 2017 to 2021, winning the Old Town Club Collegiate in 2018.

Schmid won the European Amateur in both 2019 and 2020. The 2019 event was held at the Diamond Country Club in Austria. Schmid led after a third-round 63 and won by three strokes from Euan Walker. He retained the title at Zurich Golf and Country Club in Switzerland in September 2020, again winning by three strokes, this time from fellow-German Nick Bachem.

In the 2021 Open Championship, Schmid had a second-round 65 to equal the record for the lowest round by an amateur in the Open Championship; a record set by Tom Lewis in 2011, also at Royal St George's. Schmid had an opening-round 74, leaving him on 139 after two rounds, 1-under-par, making the cut by two strokes. He had further rounds 71 and 72 for a total of 282, 2-over-par. He finished four strokes ahead of Lin Yuxin, the only other amateur to make cut, to win the silver medal as the leading amateur at the championship.

Professional career
After the 2021 Open Championship, Schmid turned professional and was invited to the following week's tournament on the European Tour, the Cazoo Open at Celtic Manor Resort, Wales. In September, he finished runner-up in the Dutch Open, three shots behind Kristoffer Broberg. In December 2021, Schmid was announced as the Sir Henry Cotton Rookie of the Year for the 2021 European Tour season.

Schmid continued to compete on the European Tour in 2022. In March, he finished tied third at the Steyn City Championship in South Africa. Other highlight performances included an eighth place finish at the Barbasol Championship in Kentucky, and a ninth placed finish at the Cazoo Open in Wales.

Amateur wins
2017 Bavarian Mens Championship
2018 Old Town Club Collegiate
2019 European Amateur
2020 European Amateur

Source:

Results in major championships
Results not in chronological order in 2020.

LA = Low amateur
CUT = missed the half-way cut
"T" indicates a tie for a place
NT = No tournament due to COVID-19 pandemic

Team appearances
Amateur
European Amateur Team Championship (representing Germany): 2019, 2020 (winners), 2021
Arnold Palmer Cup (representing the International Team): 2020 (winners), 2021

Source:

See also
2022 Korn Ferry Tour Finals graduates

References

External links

German male golfers
PGA Tour golfers
Louisville Cardinals men's golfers
Korn Ferry Tour graduates
1997 births
Living people